Tell the Truth is a panel game show based on the US version, To Tell the Truth. It was originally aired on ITV and produced by ATV from 17 September 1957 to 6 September 1961. Hosted first by David Jacobs in 1957, McDonald Hobley took over as host from July 1958. Finally, Shaw Taylor took over as host from 1959 to 1961. 
It was then revived on Channel 4  in 1983, produced by LWT in association with Goodson-Todman Productions and Talbot Television until November 1985. During this time it was hosted by Graeme Garden and then finally aired back on ITV produced by TVS in association with Mark Goodson Productions and Talbot Television from 11 April 1989 to 26 October 1990, during which time it was hosted by Fred Dinenage.

Transmissions

ATV era

None of the ATV episodes survived.

Channel 4 era

All 51 Channel 4 episodes survived.

TVS era

All 92 TVS episodes survived, but they cannot be re-aired due to an amount of paperwork missing from the company's distributor.

References

External links

1950s British game shows
1960s British game shows
1980s British game shows
1990s British game shows
1957 British television series debuts
1990 British television series endings
British panel games
Channel 4 game shows
ITV game shows
Television series by ITV Studios
British television series revived after cancellation